Goodbye Charlie Bright is a 2001 comedy-drama film directed by Nick Love and starring Paul Nicholls, Roland Manookian and Danny Dyer. The film is also known by the U.S. title Strong Boys.

Plot
Charlie drifts through life as he and his friends enjoy a lifestyle of house parties, casual sex and drugs. However, after breaking into a house to rob it, Charlie finds a gun (they found the keys and address in a handbag they had recently stolen). During the robbery, three of the friends (Charlie, Justin and Damien) accidentally awaken the owner, a hefty Jamaican man who promptly chases them into the street with a golf club. The trio escape, much to the amusement of Justin and Damien. However, despite Charlie promising to tell Justin everything, he decides to keep the gun a secret.

Sometime later the story picks up Charlie and Justin as they walk through a disused car park. After looking in the window of a BMW it becomes clear that Julie, the girlfriend of Francis (Dyer), another member of 'The Firm', is having sex with 'local nutter' Eddie (Phil Daniels), who is some 20 years older. By this time in the story it has become clear that Charlie is dissatisfied with his lifestyle and would prefer to try to make something of his life, unlike Justin, who would clearly prefer things to remain the same. This point is highlighted when the two attend a party being thrown by Charlie's cousin Hector Moriati (Richard Driscoll), with Charlie being offered a job as an estate agent. Hector eventually throws Justin out, and Hector in turn asks Charlie to stay (which he does not). On the way back home from the party, the pair begin to fight, Charlie clearly furious that Justin has ruined an opportunity for him to turn his life around. Charlie, as the narrator, informs the audience that from that point on 'Things could never be the same'.

The following day Charlie approaches Francis in the street and the pair head off to a boxing gym where Francis announces his intention to propose to Julie. Charlie tells Francis about Julie's affair with Eddie. Francis, in a tearful rage, walks out of the room and goes on the hunt for Eddie, baseball bat in hand. When Francis eventually finds Eddie he smashes the window of his BMW, provoking Eddie to run him down. Charlie then arrives as Francis lies unconscious in the road. As Charlie waits in hospital he is visibly moved by an upset woman, presumably Francis's mother, and decides to take revenge on Eddie with the stolen pistol. After finding Eddie he loses his nerve, prompting Eddie to tell him to 'Fuck off out my house before you and I fall out'. After leaving, Charlie eventually shows the gun to Justin, who becomes very attached to it and suggests that they should kill Eddie.

Justin is later insulted by a child in the park and threatens him with the gun, going as far as pushing the barrel into the frightened boy's mouth. Horrified, Charlie snatches the gun from Justin and tells him he no longer wishes to be associated with him. A distressed Justin tries to make amends but Charlie refuses, instead giving him the gun as a farewell gift. Instantly Justin runs off, pursued by Charlie who has realised that Justin intends to use the weapon. Charlie catches up to Justin but only watches as Justin shoots Eddie in the leg (he survives the shot and is heard shouting afterwards) and the pair make their way to the top of a high rise building. The police arrive and Justin tells Charlie to leave or risk being arrested. Charlie seemingly forgives Justin and the two hug.

The final scene shows the pair going down different paths: Justin turning himself in to the police with a smile on his face and with a crowd cheering for him, and Charlie as he packs his bags and leaves. A child (who makes several appearances throughout the film) asks Charlie where he's going as he leaves; he simply replies "Somewhere".

Cast
Paul Nicholls as Charlie Bright
Roland Manookian as Justin
Phil Daniels as Eddie
Jamie Foreman as Tony Immaculate
Danny Dyer as Francis
David Thewlis as Charlie's dad
Dani Behr as Blondie
Richard Driscoll as Hector
Sid Mitchell as Tommy Mitchell
Nicola Stapleton as Julie
Brian Jordan as Duke
Frank Harper as Tommy's dad
Lucy Bowen as Duke's girlfriend
Sian Welsh as Janet
Brinsley Forde as Floyd
Sally Bretton as Susan
Alexis Rodney as Damien
Tameka Empson as Kay
Rajeev Ahya as Gang Youth 1

Filming locations
Much of the film was filmed on the Cambridge Road Estate, Kingston Upon Thames.

Critical reaction
The Sun labelled the film 'Hilarious, terrifying, tender, an awesome rollercoaster ride you won't want to get off.'

References

External links
 

2001 films
British drama films
2001 drama films
Vertigo Films films
Films directed by Nick Love
2001 directorial debut films
2000s English-language films
2000s British films